Hangover is a 2010 Bengali satirical comedy film directed by Prabhat Roy and produced by  Rose Valley Films Pvt. Ltd under the banner of Rose Valley Films Pvt. Ltd. The film features actors Prosenjit Chatterjee and Sayantika Banerjee in the lead roles. Music of the film has been composed by Bappi Lahiri.

Cast 
 Prosenjit Chatterjee as Samaresh Chatterjee
 Sayantika Banerjee as Mili Mitra, Samaresh's P.A
 Joy Kumar Mukherjee as Rajib Sen
 Subhasish Mukhopadhyay as Bongshi, Samaresh's office servant
 Biplab Chatterjee as Banka Chatterjee, Samaresh's elder brother
 Supriyo Dutta as Nekde Dutta, private detective and photographer
 Subhra Kundu as Chandana Chatterjee, Samaresh's wife
 Sankalita Roy as Mitali Ghosh Dastidar
Cameo Appearances (in Joy Bangla Song)
 Ranjit Mallick as himself
 Bappi Lahiri as himself
 Biswanath Basu as himself
 Tapas Paul as himself
 Kanchan Mullick as himself
 Haranath Chakraborty as himself
 Rahul Banerjee as himself
 Shankar Chakraborty as himself
 Soham Chakraborty as himself
 Sabyasachi Chakraborty as himself
 Debdoot Ghosh as himself
 Saheb Chatterjee as himself
 Koel Mallick as herself
 Subhashree Ganguly as herself
 Indrani Dutta as herself
 Sohini Paul as herself
 June Malia as herself

Soundtrack
All music composed by Bappi Lahiri.

References

External links

Bengali-language Indian films
2010 films
2010s Bengali-language films
Films directed by Prabhat Roy